The 1969–70 Northern Football League season was the 73rd in the history of Northern Football League, a football competition in England.

Clubs

Division One featured 18 clubs which competed in the league last season, no new clubs joined the league this season.

League table

References

External links
 Northern Football League official site

Northern Football League seasons
1969–70 in English football leagues